The England national cricket team toured New Zealand in February and March 1978 and played a three-match Test series against the New Zealand national cricket team. The series was drawn 1–1.

Tour match summary

England vs Auckland

England vs Northern Districts

England vs Central Districts

England vs Canterbury

Test series summary

First Test

Second Test

Third Test

Gallery

References

1978 in English cricket
1978 in New Zealand cricket
New Zealand cricket seasons from 1970–71 to 1999–2000
1977-78
International cricket competitions from 1975–76 to 1980